Insect ecology is the scientific study of how insects, individually or as a community, interact with the surrounding environment or ecosystem.

Insects play significant roles in the ecology of the world due to their vast diversity of form, function and lifestyle; their considerable biomass; and their interaction with plant life, other organisms and the environment. Since they are the major contributor to biodiversity in the majority of habitats, except in the sea, they accordingly play a variety of extremely important ecological roles in the many functions of an ecosystem. Taking the case of nutrient recycling, insects contribute to this vital function by degrading or consuming leaf litter, wood, carrion and dung and by dispersal of fungi.

Insects form an important part of the food chain, especially for entomophagous vertebrates such as many mammals, birds, amphibians and reptiles. Insects play an important role in maintaining community structure and composition; in the case of animals by transmission of diseases, predation and parasitism, and in the case of plants, through phytophagy and by plant propagation through pollination and seed dispersal. From an anthropocentric point of view, insects compete with humans; they consume as much as 10% of the food produced by man and infect one in six humans with a pathogen.

Community ecology

Community ecology is the process by which a group of organisms which live in the same location interact.  There is direct interaction, which takes the form of symbiosis, competition and predation, which are the most easily notable.  There is also indirect interaction, such as reproduction, foraging patterns and decaying.  Every organism is at its most basic state could be a consumer in some situations, and a producer in others.  The culmination of all these interactions is what defines a community and what differentiates one from another.  Insects often play several roles in these communities, though these roles vary widely based on what species is present.

Decomposers

Decomposer insects are ones that feed on dead or rotten bodies of plant or animal life.  These insects are called saprophages and fall into three main categories: those that feed on dead or dying plant matter, those that feed on dead animals (carrion), and those that feed on excrement (feces) of other animals.  As dead plants are eaten away, more surface area is exposed, allowing the plants to decay faster due to an increase in microorganisms eating the plant.  These insects are largely responsible for helping to create a layer of humus on the soil that provides an ideal environment for various fungi, microorganisms and bacteria.  These organisms produce much of the nitrogen, carbon, and minerals that plants need for growth.  Carrion feeders include several beetles, ants, mites, wasps, fly larvae (maggots), and others.  These insects occupy the dead body for a short period of time but rapidly consume and/or bury the carcass.  Typically, some species of fly are the first to eat the body, but the order of insects that follows is predictable and known as the faunal succession.  Many dung beetles and manure flies are attracted to the smell of animal feces.  The adults often lay eggs on fresh excrement and the larvae will feed on the organic matter.  Many species of dung-feeders have evolved so they will only feed on feces from a specific species.  There is even a type of dung-beetle that will roll feces into a ball, push it into a pre-dug hole, lay an egg in that dung and then cover it with fresh dirt to provide a perfect nursery for their larvae.

Carnivores

Carnivorous insects survive by eating other living animals, be it through hunting, sucking blood, or as an internal parasite.  These insects fall into three basic categories: predators, parasites, and parasitoids.

Predatory insects are typically larger as their survival is dependent upon their ability to hunt, kill/immobilize, and eat their prey.  However, there are several exceptions, with ants being the most notable.  Ants, and other colony insects, can use their sheer numbers to overwhelm their prey even if the ants are significantly smaller.  They often have specialized mandibles (mouthparts) for this task, some causing excruciating pain, paralysis, or simply having a high bite force.  Conversely, insects that live on their own must be able to reliably bring down their prey and as such have developed a myriad of unique hunting methods.  Some actively travel, seeking out their prey, while others wait in an ambush.  Others may release chemicals to attract specific creatures and others still will eat anything they can.

Parasites infest the victim's body and eat it from the inside out.  The presence of the parasite is often not noticed by the host as the size discrepancy is typically so vast.  Parasites vary widely in how they survive in their host; some complete their full life cycle within the body while others may only stay in for the duration of their larval stage.  There is as great of variation in methodology and species in parasites as in any other type of insect.  The most threatening parasites to humans are ones that live outside the host and consume the host's blood.  These species transmit viruses, disease, and even other, smaller parasites to the host, spreading these throughout the populations of many third world countries with poor health care.

A subcategory of parasites, called parasitoids, is one that feeds on the host body so much so that the host is eventually eaten.  One species of wasp, the spider wasp, will paralyze spiders before bringing them back to their nest and injecting them with a wasp larvae.  The larvae will eat its way out, secreting a numbing and paralyzing agent until there is nothing left of the spider other than the exoskeleton, then go through a metamorphism and become an adult wasp.

Herbivores
Out of all described eukaryotes almost one third are herbivorous insects, about 500,000. They feed on living plant matter or the products of a plant. These insects may eat essential parts of the plant, such as the leaves or sap, or they may survive on the pollen and nectar produced by the plant.  Herbivorous insects often use olfactory or visual cues to determine a potential host plant.  A visual cue could simply be the outline of a certain type of leaf, or the high contrast between the petals of a flower and the leaves surrounding it.  These are typically associated with the olfactory signal an insect may receive from their intended meal.  The olfactory cue could be the scent of the nectar produced by a flower, a certain chemical excreted to repel unwanted predators, or the exposed sap of a cherry tree. Either of these two senses could be the driving force behind an insect choosing to consume a certain plant, but it is only after it takes the first bite, and the confirmation of this food is made by its sense of taste, that it truly feeds.  After a herbivorous insect is finished feeding on a plant, it will either wait there until hungry again, or move on to another task, be it finding more food, a mate, or shelter.  Herbivorous insects bring significantly more danger to a plant than that of consumption; they are among the most prominent disease-carrying creatures in the insect world.  There are numerous diseases, fungi, and parasites that can be carried by nearly any herbivorous insect, many of which fatal to the plant infected.  Some diseases even produce a sweet smelling, sticky secretion from the infected plant to attract more insects and spread farther. In return plants have their own defenses. Some of these defenses are toxic secondary metabolites to deter insects. These toxins limit the diet breadth of herbivores, and evolving mechanisms to nonetheless continue herbivory is an important part of maintaining diet breadth in insects, and so in their evolutionary history as a whole. Both pleiotropy and epistasis have complex effects in this regard, with the simulations of Griswold 2006 showing that more genes provide the benefit of more targets for adaptive mutations, while Fisher 1930 showed that a mutation can improve one trait while epistasis causes it to also trigger negative effects - slowing down adaptation.

Schoonhoven and associates, from Blaney et al 1985 to Schoonhoven et al 1992, illuminate the interplay between chemoreceptor stimuli in Lepidoptera and Orthoptera. They used Helicoverpa armigera, Spodoptera littoralis, S. frugiperda, Chloridea virescens, and grasshoppers. They find that most insects respond immediately and roughly equally to phagostimulant  indicating good food  and phagodeterrent  indicating a food to be avoided, or a material which is not food  substances. They also present some divergent examples, both delayed response  suggesting that food decisions were mediated by cognition and not just simple chemoreception  and unequal chemoreceptor stimulation  with gustatory cells firing equally when presented with any material, but deterrent cells firing to a greater degree for undesirable materials. (They also investigate similar questions of seeking/avoidance in common questions of dietary balance of protein and carbohydrate  i.e. less risky dietary choices where toxins are not the deciding factor  and find similar results, with some insects eating solely by chemoreception and some showing delayed decisions, suggesting cognition.) Both salicin and caffeine are antifeedants, and some of the Schoonhoven group's investigations test both the deterrence they produce and habituation to them. The Glendinning group has done some similar work. They find Manduca sextas habituation to salicin to be cognitively mediated because deterrent sensory cell stimulation barely decreases even when avoidance ceases. On the other hand Glendinning et al 1999 finds M. sexta habituation to caffeine to be due to change in chemoreceptor activation because it decreases significantly, and at the same time as cessation of feeding avoidance. The same work tests the cross-effects of habituation between the two chemicals, finding that they probably share a second messenger. For both phagostimulus and deterrence stimuli they find that the effects of multiple stimulations by multiple substances  upon the same cells, simultaneously  produce additive effects, up to the cell's firing rate ceiling.

Climate change is expected to change herbivory relationships. Liu et al 2011 finds no change in distribution in one example, but instead the same herbivore switched primary hosts due to altered flowering time. Gillespie et al 2012 found host mismatch due to temperature shift. (These methodologies in herbivory could be applied to study the same question in climate change + pollination.  however this remains to be tried.)

Coevolution 
Coevolution is the ecological process by which two species exclusively affect each other’s evolution. This concept is essential to the study of insect ecology. Coevolution is particularly important in how it can lead to both micro- and macro-evolutionary changes. Micro-evolutionary changes include shifts in genome and alleles while macro-evolution is the emergence of a new species, also called speciation. Two species that coevolve experience reciprocal evolution and go through biological changes as a result of the other species. One example of this in insect ecology is the coevolution of Dasyscolia ciliata, a species of wasp, and Ophrys speculum, a species of orchid. These two species have both evolved in such a way that the wasp is the only known pollinator of the plant. This relationship can be seen in other species of flowering plants and pollinating insects, but a more distinct example is the coevolution of ants and acacias. The acacia ant (Pseudomyrmex ferruginea) is an insect that has been discovered to protect five different species of acacia trees. The ant provides protection to the plant while the acacias reciprocate by supplying food and shelter. Over generations, these two species have adapted to accommodate each other, an example of coevolution.

Interspecific relationships 
Due to their diverse functions, diets, and lifestyles, insects are integral components of terrestrial ecological communities. Beyond functioning as decomposers, carnivores, and herbivores, insects often participate in other species interactions. These interactions can both positively and adversely affect plants, mammals, and other insects. More specifically, insects participate in mutualism, amensalism, commensalism, predation and parasitism.

Mutualism 
Mutualism is a symbiotic relationship between two or more species in which each benefits. Common mutualistic relationships include cleaning symbiosis, animal induced pollination, or protection from predators. One example of insect mutualism is the pollination of flowering plants by insects, a field of study known as anthecology. Primarily, various bee species work as pollinators of flowering plants, feeding on their nectar and in turn picking up their pollen and spreading it to other flowers. Another example of insect mutualism is the process by which ants shelter and feed aphids in their anthills and feed off of their honeydew in return.

Amensalism 
Amensalism is a non-symbiotic species interaction in which one organism negatively affects the other organism but is unaffected by that organism. This type of species interaction is common in nature, and an example in insect ecology is between goats and insects. The two individuals compete for the same food source, but goats will deprive the latter from feeding. The goat is completely unaffected by the interaction, but the insect is left hungry.

Commensalism 
Commensalism is a different type of ecological interaction between species in which one species gains benefits while the other is neither harmed nor benefited. Two examples of commensalism that can be seen in insect ecology are phoresy, an interaction in which one attaches itself to another for transportation, and inquilinism, the use of another organism for shelter. Ticks and mites have adapted to latch onto beetles, flies, and bees (as well as other organisms) for transportation, an example of phoresy. In terms of inquilinism, insects commonly establish themselves in human garages or shelters of other animals for protection against predators and weather.

Parasitoid insects 
Parasitoids are insects that live intimately with a host, feed off of the host like a parasite, but eventually kill the host. This specific type of species interaction is exclusive to insects and is employed most commonly by wasps. An example of this is when parasitoid wasps inject their eggs into aphids. The eggs will eventually hatch and produce wasp larvae that feed on and consume the organism. Additionally, some parasitoids chemically affect the host to propagate the development of parasitic offspring. Each parasitoid wasps typically preys on a specific insect or spider species, and the host life-stage at which the wasp deposits its seed differs. In regard to humans, parasitoid insects are favored because they can be used as biological pest controls for farmers, preying on other insects that damage crops.

References

Bibliography 

  (1999). Ecological Entomology. 2nd Edition (illustrated). John Wiley and Sons. , .Limited preview on Google Books. Accessed on 09 Jan 2010,

External links 

 
Articles containing video clips